The Belgian Basketball Cup Most Valuable Player (MVP) is an annual award that is given to the most valuable player of the Belgian Basketball Cup, which is the top-tier national domestic men's basketball cup competition in the country of Belgium.

Winners

Awards won by nationality

Awards won by club

References

Basketball most valuable player awards
 
European basketball awards